America is an unincorporated community in Liberty Township, Wabash County, in the U.S. state of Indiana.

It is located just east of the nearby town of La Fontaine.

History

A post office was established at America in 1837, and remained in operation until it was discontinued in 1881.

Geography

References

Unincorporated communities in Wabash County, Indiana
Unincorporated communities in Indiana